is a passenger railway station located in the city of Kawachinagano, Osaka Prefecture, Japan, operated by the private railway operator Nankai Electric Railway. It has the station number "NK71".

Lines

Layout
The station consists of two ground-level opposed side platforms connected by an elevated station building.

Platforms

Adjacent stations

History
Mikanodai Station opened on September 1, 1984.

Passenger statistics
In fiscal 2019, the station was used by an average of 3,659 passengers daily.

Surrounding area
 Nankai Mikanodai New Town

See also
 List of railway stations in Japan

References

External links

  

Railway stations in Japan opened in 1984
Railway stations in Osaka Prefecture
Kawachinagano